M21 is a Ukrainian international highway (M-highway) which connects Zhytomyr and Vinnytsia to the border with Moldova. The highway also connects two major transnational corridors, Pan-European Corridor IX and the transportation corridor "Europe-Asia". The entire route is part of European route E583. The section from Zhytomyr to the Belorussian border was previously P28.

Route

See also

 Roads in Ukraine
 Ukraine Highways
 International E-road network
 Pan-European corridors

References

External links
 International Roads in Ukraine in Russian
 European Roads in Russian

Vinnytsia
Zhytomyr
Mohyliv-Podilskyi
Roads in Vinnytsia Oblast
Roads in Zhytomyr Oblast